Soumbalgwang is a South Korean post-hardcore band consisting of members Kang Dong-soo, Kim Ki-tae, Kim Bo-kyeong and Kim Ki-young. Since their formation in 2016,  the band has released their studio albums, Fuze (도화선) (2020) and Happiness, Flower (기쁨, 꽃) (2021).

Career 
Soumbalgwang was established in Busan in 2016 and there have been many member replacements since its formation. In 2019, they released an EP Huh (풋) inspired by the track name of the Onnine Ibalgwan's debut album Pigeon is a Rat in the Sky (비둘기는 하늘의 쥐), and they released its studio album, Fuze (도화선), in 2020. 

Their second studio album, Happiness, Flower (기쁨, 꽃)was released in 2021. The album was produced by Kim Byung-kyu, a guitarist of Korean rock band Say Sue Me. In March 2022, they won the Best Rock Album and Best Rock Song at the Korean Music Awards.

Discography

Studio albums

EP

Awards and nominations

References

South Korean post-punk music groups 
Post-hardcore groups
Musical groups established in 2016
Korean Music Award winners
2016 establishments in South Korea